The 2005 FIA GT Bahrain Supercar 500 was the eleventh and final race for the 2005 FIA GT Championship season.  It took place at the Bahrain International Circuit, Bahrain, on November 25, 2005.

Official results
Class winners in bold.  Cars failing to complete 70% of winner's distance marked as Not Classified (NC).

Statistics
 Pole Position – #17 Russian Age Racing – 1:54.184
 Fastest Lap – #16 JMB Racing – 1:56.478
 Average Speed – 160.830 km/h

External links
 Official Results
 Race results

Bahrain
FIA GT